

Sääretükk Lighthouse (Estonian: Sääretüki tuletorn) is a lighthouse located on the island of Saaremaa, in Estonia. The lighthouse was built in 1954, with a concrete structure. With an automatic glare configuration since 1995, with the sequence of: 0.5 s on, 1 s off, 0.5 s on, 8 s off.

See also 

 List of lighthouses in Estonia

References

External links 

 

Lighthouses completed in 1954
Resort architecture in Estonia
Lighthouses in Estonia
Saaremaa Parish
Buildings and structures in Saaremaa